The Puerto Rico Municipal Financing Agency (MFA) — (AFM)— is the municipal bond issuer and an intragovernmental bank of the government of Puerto Rico. The Agency is a government-owned corporation of the government of Puerto Rico and a principal affiliate of the Puerto Rico Government Development Bank.

Bonds issued

 Series A Bonds
 Series B Refunding Bonds
 Series C Refunding Bonds

References

External links
 Overview of the MFA at the Government Development Bank 

Finance in Puerto Rico
Government-owned corporations of Puerto Rico
Public debt of Puerto Rico
Local government finance